Carrickmacross railway station was on the Great Northern Railway (Ireland) in the Republic of Ireland.

The Great Northern Railway (Ireland) opened the station on 31 July 1886. It closed on 10 March 1947.

The station building and platform have since been demolished, but the engine house, station house, water tower and a number of sheds remain. The former stationmasters house is also fully intact now used as a domestic residence.

Routes

References

Carrickmacross
Disused railway stations in County Monaghan
Railway stations opened in 1886
Railway stations closed in 1947